Estonian Ramblers' Association (abbreviation ERA) is one of the sport governing bodies in Estonia which deals with different type of sport rambling (hiking), including climbing and mountaineering.

ERA is established about 1993. ERA is a member of European Ramblers' Association (ERA) and Estonian Olympic Committee.

References

External links
 

Sports governing bodies in Estonia
Hiking organizations